Arguiñano is a surname. Notable people with the surname include:

Eva Arguiñano (born 1960), Spanish chef and television presenter
Karlos Arguiñano (born 1948), Spanish chef and television presenter, brother of Eva
Jesús María Zubiarraín Arguiñano (1945–1993), Spanish footballer